Ube halaya or halayang ube (variant spellings halea, haleya; from the Spanish jalea, "jelly") is a Philippine dessert made from boiled and mashed purple yam (Dioscorea alata, locally known as ube). Ube halaya is the main base in ube/purple yam flavored-pastries and ice cream. It can also be incorporated in other desserts such as halo-halo. It is also commonly anglicized as ube jam, or called by its original native name, nilupak na ube.

History
The Philippines shows the highest phenotypic diversity of ube (Dioscorea alata), making it one of the likely centers of origin of ube domestication. Remains of ube have been recovered from the Ille Cave archaeological site of Palawan (c. 11,000 BP).

Preparation
The main ingredient is peeled and boiled purple yam which is grated and mashed. The mashed yam, with condensed milk  (originally sweetened coconut milk), are added to a saucepan where butter or margarine had been melted. The mixture is stirred until thickened. Once thickened, the mixture is cooled down and placed on a platter or into containers of various shapes.

Ube halaya is typically served cold, after refrigeration. Optional topping includes browned grated coconut, latik, or condensed milk.

Variations

Ube halaya is a type of nilupak (mashed/pounded starchy food with coconut milk and sugar) which has several variants that use other types of starchy root crops or fruits. Generally, the term halaya is reserved for nilupak made with ube and calabaza, while nilupak is more commonly used for variants made with mashed cassava or saba bananas. Variants made from sweet potato and taro can be known as either halaya or nilupak.

Ube halaya also superficially resembles kalamay ube, but differs in that kalamay ube additionally uses ground glutinous rice (galapong) and has smoother more viscous texture.

Ube macapuno

Ube halaya served with macapuno (coconut sport) is a notable combination known as ube macapuno. The combination is also used in other ube recipes, like in ube cakes and ube ice cream.

Camote halaya
Camote halaya, sometimes known as "camote delight" or "sweet potato jam", is a variant that uses mashed sweet potato (camote) instead of ube. It is prepared identically to ube halaya. It has a light yellow color to bright orange to purple color, depending on the cultivar of sweet potato used. It is traditionally known as nilupak na kamote, especially when served on banana leaves. Purple versions of camote halaya can sometimes be confused with or used as a substitute for ube halaya.

Halayang kalabasa
Halayang kalabasa, also known as "squash halaya" or "pumpkin jam", is a variant that uses mashed calabaza (kalabasa). It is prepared identically to ube halaya. It is typically orange to light brown in color.

Binagol

Binagol is a unique version from the Eastern Visayas which use mashed taro corms. It is distinctively sold in halved coconut shells. It can range in color from creamy white to brown.

Nilupak na ube at gabi
Nilupak na ube at gabi is a Tagalog version that combines ube with taro corms.

See also
Ube cake
Ube crinkle
Ube ice cream
Maja de ube
Cuisine of the Philippines
Nilupak
Poi
 List of sweet potato dishes

References

 OnAlejandro, R., & Tettoni, L. (2012). Authentic Recipes from the Philippines. New York: Tuttle Pub.

Philippine desserts
Ube dishes